is a Japanese track and field athlete. He competed in the men's triple jump at the 1968 Summer Olympics and the 1972 Summer Olympics. He later became a professor of sports science at the University of Tsukuba and Hosei University.

References

1945 births
Living people
Place of birth missing (living people)
Japanese male triple jumpers
Olympic male triple jumpers
Olympic athletes of Japan
Athletes (track and field) at the 1968 Summer Olympics
Athletes (track and field) at the 1972 Summer Olympics
Japan Championships in Athletics winners
Academic staff of the University of Tsukuba
Academic staff of Hosei University